Schinia walsinghami is a moth of the family Noctuidae. It is found from British Columbia south to California.

The wingspan is about 24 mm. Adults fly in late summer.

The larvae feed on Chrysothamnus and Ericameria species.

External links
Image
Macromoths of Northwest Forests and Woodlands

Schinia
Moths of North America
Moths described in 1881